The Bukit Kiara Muslim Cemetery is a cemetery in Kuala Lumpur, Malaysia. It is located at Damansara near Taman Tun Dr Ismail. This cemetery can be seen from the Damansara Link of the Sprint Expressway. It is the final resting place of many prominent Malay personalities.

Background 

The Bukit Kiara Muslim Cemetery was opened in 1985. There are four phases at this cemetery. Phase 1 was opened in 1985 and Phase 2 opened in 2008. Phase 3 and 4 remained for future uses.

Notable burials 
 Kamaluddin Muhamad (Keris Mas) – National Laureate (Sasterawan Negara) (died 1992)
 Tan Sri Jaffar Hussein – 4th Governor of the Central Bank of Malaysia (died 1998) 
 Usman Awang – National Laureate (Sasterawan Negara) (died 2001)
 Tan Sri Dr. Noordin Sopiee – Executive Chairman of the Institute of Strategic and International Studies (ISIS) (died 2005)
 Tun Abdullah Salleh – Former Chief Secretary to the Government and founder of the Universiti Kebangsaan Malaysia (UKM) (died 2006)
 Syed Hussein Alatas – Former Vice-Chancellor of the University of Malaya and founder of the Parti Gerakan Rakyat Malaysia (PGRM) (died 2007)
 Tan Sri Megat Junid Megat Ayub – cabinet minister and Minister of Domestic Trade and Consumer Affairs (died 2008)
 Rustam Abdullah Sani – Political writers, analysis and Parti Rakyat Malaysia (PRM) deputy president (died 2008)
 Tan Sri A. Samad Ismail – Journalist, National Journalism Laureate, writer and editor (died 2008)
 Muhammad Dahlan Abdul Baing (Arena Wati) – National Laureate (Sasterawan Negara) (died 2009)
 Tan Sri Mohamed Yaacob – Former Menteri Besar of Kelantan (died 2009)
 Tan Sri Mohamed Rahmat – Minister of Information and UMNO secretary general (died 2010)
 Dato' Abdul Ajib Ahmad – Menteri Besar of Johor (Chief Minister) (1982–86) (died 2011)
 Azah Aziz – wife of Royal Professor Ungku Abdul Aziz (died 2012)
 Tan Sri Aishah Ghani – UMNO veteran and Welfare Minister (died 2013)
 Hussain Ahmad Najadi – Arab Malaysian Banking Group (AmBank) founder (died 2013)
 Azean Irdawaty – veteran actress and singer (died 2013)
 Datuk Sharifah Aini – "Biduanita Negara" (National Songstress), veteran singer and entertainer (died 2014)
 Mohd Bakri Omar – Former Inspector General of Police (died 2014)
 Datuk Abdullah Hussain – National Laureate (Sasterawan Negara) (died 2014)
 Siti Rahmah Kassim – Malaysian national hero (died 2017)
 Tan Sri Sanusi Junid – Minister of National and Rural Development, Minister of Agriculture and seventh Menteri Besar of Kedah (1996–99) (died 2018)
 Tan Sri Hashim Aman – 7th Chief Secretary to the Government of Malaysia (died 2018)
 Tun Abdullah Ayub – 6th Chief Secretary to the Government of Malaysia (died 2018)
 Mokhtar Hashim – Former Minister of Culture, Youth and Sports (died 2020)
 Royal Professor Ungku Abdul Aziz Ungku Abdul Hamid – Malaysian economist (died 2020)
 Railey Jeffrey – Deputy Minister of Information and Deputy Minister of Works (died 2020)
 Tan Sri Mohd Ghazali Mohd Seth – 7th Chief of the Malaysian Defence Forces (died 2021)
 Tan Sri Mohd Zaman Khan Rahim Khan – former Bukit Aman Criminal Investigation Department (CID) director and Director-General of the Prisons Department (1994–1997) (died 2021)
 Tan Sri Sabbaruddin Chik – former Minister of Culture, Arts and Tourism (died 2021)
 Jit Murad – veteran actor, writer, playwright and theatre activist (died 2022)
 Tengku Tan Sri Ahmad Rithauddeen Tengku Ismail – former Minister of Defence (died 2022)

External links
 
 Bukit Kiara Muslim Cemetery on E-Pusara website

Cemeteries in Kuala Lumpur
Muslim cemeteries